The Spanish Road (Spanish: Camino Español, German: Spanische Straße) was a military road and trade route in the late sixteenth and early seventeenth centuries, linking the Duchy of Milan, the Franche-Comté and the Spanish Netherlands, all of which were at the time territories of the Spanish Empire under the Habsburgs. It was also known as the Road of the Spaniards (Camino de los Españoles), Road of the Spanish Tercios (Camino de los Tercios Españoles), or Sardinian Corridor (Corredor Sardo) in Spanish.

The Spanish Road was created under Philip II as a vital artery for the Spanish war effort during the Eighty Years' War against the Dutch Republic. For Spain, it would have been much quicker to ship troops and supplies directly from Spain to the Low Countries – a sailing ship of the time could usually cover about  a day, whereas the average pace of soldiers marching on the Spanish Road was only  a day. However, Spanish vessels sailing up the English Channel could have to run a deadly gauntlet of attacks by the French, English and Dutch, all of whom were hostile to Spain for much of this period. It was therefore much safer for Spain to transport its armies across the relatively secure waters of the Western Mediterranean to Italy and then march them overland along the  length of the Spanish Road from Milan to Luxembourg, all of which were then Spanish territories.

During the Eighty Years' War, between 1567 and 1633, some 123,000 men were transported to the Spanish Netherlands by this overland route, compared to only 17,600 transported by sea. The road was eventually cut off for Spanish military use, after the Kingdom of France joined in Thirty Years' War on the Dutch side and occupied Spanish territories along the route.

Background 
The conflict between Philip II of Spain and the Dutch rebels in the Spanish Netherlands, culminating in the Eighty Years' War, was part of a broader European power struggle of the 16th century between Catholics and Protestants. By 1550, wars against both German Protestants and (Catholic) France had stretched Spain's finances thin, requiring the imposition of new taxes on the Spanish Netherlands. The resentment this caused was compounded by a poor harvest in 1565, leading to famine in 1566 (known as the 'Year of Hunger' or 'Year of Wonders'). In that same year social, political and religious unrest climaxed with the Compromise of Nobles and the Beeldenstorm, apparently endangering the government of Philip's Regent in Brussels, Margaret of Parma. Spanish troops under the Duke of Alba were dispatched to restore order and punish the perceived insurrectionists, triggering the Dutch Revolt and the broader Eighty Years' War. As these troops could not be transported by sea, Philip was therefore forced to find a way to move troops from his garrisons in Lombardy overland to the Spanish Netherlands. The Spanish Road was surveyed and mapped out in 1566, and Alba used it in July 1567.

History

1567–1601: Savoyard route 
The initial route of the Spanish Road ran northwest from the Duchy of Milan through the Duchy of Savoy, a Spanish ally, to the Spanish Franche-Comté, and from there due north through the Duchy of Lorraine, another Spanish ally, to Luxembourg in the Spanish Netherlands. This was the path along which Alba's forces marched in 1567, and Spanish forces continued to use it without significant interruption for the next thirty years.

At the turn of the century, however, Savoy was defeated by France in the Franco-Savoyard War (1600–1601). Under the resulting Treaty of Lyon (1601), Savoy was obliged to cede its two northernmost provinces, Bugey and Bresse, to France, which meant that a significant stretch of the Spanish Road now lay on French soil. France was generally hostile to Spain in this period (the two kingdoms had been at war as recently as 1598), and Spanish troop movements along the Road were thus blocked.

With the old route through Bugey and Bresse closed off by the French, the Spanish sponsored an attempt by Charles Emmanuel I, Duke of Savoy to conquer the Republic of Geneva. The rationale behind this was that the Republic bordered both Savoy and Franche-Comté, and its annexation to Savoy would enable Spanish troops to bypass the French and again reach Franche-Comté directly from Savoy. In the event, however Charles-Emmanuel's attempt to take Geneva by escalade miscarried; the failure of the Savoyard assault, made on the night of 12 December 1602, is still celebrated by Genevans in the l'Escalade festival.

1601–1609: Swiss and Valtellinese routes 

The defeat of the Savoyard attack on Geneva dashed the last hopes of restoring the old route of the Spanish Road through Savoy, and so the Spanish subsequently started looking for an alternative to the east.

The most straightforward option was to march the troops due north from Milan over the St Gotthard Pass and then down through Central Switzerland to the High Rhine. Crossing the Rhine would bring the Spanish armies into Further Austria, which was friendly territory as the Austrian Habsburgs were cousins and close allies of Spain's own Habsburg royal family. From Further Austria the Spanish could then march directly through neighbouring Upper Alsace, another Austrian Habsburg possession, to Lorraine and on to the Spanish Netherlands. The Swiss Confederacy was willing in principle to allow Spanish forces onto its territory, but the presence on Swiss soil of Catholic troops en route to fight against the Protestant Dutch Republic caused considerable disquiet in the Protestant cantons and threatened to trigger a new phase of Switzerland's sectarian civil wars. In order to make the Spanish troops as inconspicuous as possible, the Confederacy therefore imposed a number of conditions on their transit across Switzerland – for example the treaty agreed in 1604 stipulated that when on Swiss soil Spanish soldiers would be required to march unarmed and in groups of no more than two hundred men at a time. The stringency of these restrictions made it difficult for Spain to move forces through Switzerland efficiently, and they only sent six major expeditions along this route before giving up on it permanently.

The alternative was for the Spanish to go even further east and march their armies northeast from Milan through the Valtellina, the southernmost territory of the Three Leagues. At the eastern end of the Valtellina was the Stelvio Pass, and on the far side of that was the County of Tyrol, yet another Austrian Habsburg territory from which Spanish forces could proceed northwest via Further Austria to Upper Alsace and then north across Lorraine to the Spanish Netherlands, as described above. Indeed, the Spanish Governor of Milan, the Count of Fuentes, had already negotiated a deal with the Three Leagues to use this route as early as 1592.

However, the Three Leagues was like the Swiss Confederacy a biconfessional federation, comprising a patchwork of Catholic and Protestant districts, and the latter resented the Spanish presence within their borders for the same reasons as their Swiss coreligionists; furthermore their hostility to Spain was stoked for geopolitical reasons by Spain's Catholic enemies France and Venice. In 1603 the Venetians persuaded the Leagues to grant them exclusive access to the Valtellina, thereby nullifying the agreement the Leagues had signed with Fuentes eleven years previously. The governor responded by erecting Fort Fuentes on the Milanese-Valtellinese border in a bid to intimidate the Three Leagues into repudiating the Venetian treaty, but to little effect.

Thus by 1610 all three variants of the Spanish Road had become largely impassable to Spanish troops, owing to the French annexation of Bugey and Bresse, the heavy restrictions imposed on transit through the Swiss Confederacy, and the Venetian treaty with the Three Leagues. However, this disruption did not matter overly much in the short term as in 1609 the Twelve Years' Truce came into effect, suspending fighting in the Eighty Years' War and temporarily removing the need for Spain to keep up a steady stream of reinforcements to the Army of Flanders.

1619–1635: Reopened Valtellinese route 

The Twelve Years' Truce broke down in 1619 (two years ahead of its projected expiry date), and Spain therefore found itself obliged to start sending large armies to the Low Countries again. It therefore became imperative to find a way of reopening the Spanish Road as soon as possible.

The Duke of Feria, Fuentes's successor as Governor of Milan, therefore instigated a Catholic insurrection in the Three Leagues, sparking a religious civil war, the Bündner Wirren (Graubünden Disturbances), within the federation. While the Leagues fought among themselves he then invaded the Valtellina in a bid to annex the territory outright and thereby reopen the Spanish Road via Tyrol. This alarmed France, which sent an expeditionary force to the Valtellina under the command of the famed mountain warfare specialist Lesdiguières. The resulting Valtellina War ended in stalemate, and under the Treaty of Monzón (1626) Spain was forced to return the Valtellina to the Three Leagues, but crucially the road through Valtellina to the Stelvio Pass was reopened, enabling troop movements along the Spanish Road to resume.

Multiple Spanish armies travelled along the reopened Spanish Road during the late 1620s and early 1630s, some to the traditional battlefield in the Low Countries but others to Germany, where the Thirty Years' War was now raging, in order to support the beleaguered Austrian Habsburgs. One of the Spanish armies to use the Road during this period was that of Cardinal-Infante Ferdinand, which won a series of important victories in  Germany including the First Battle of Nördlingen.

1635–1648: End of the Road

The Habsburg victories in Germany alarmed the French chief minister Cardinal Richelieu, who in 1635 brought France into the Thirty Years' War against Austria and also declared war on Spain. In the late 1630s Henri de Rohan mounted a second French expedition into the Valtellina, hampering Spanish troop movements through the valley, while other French forces invaded Upper Alsace, which they conquered and permanently annexed to France after defeating the Austrians at the Battle of Breisach. The Spanish Road was thereby cut at two points, in the south between Milan and Tyrol and in the north between  Further Austria and Lorraine.

With the Spanish Road closed off, the Spanish were therefore forced to start transporting their armies to the Low Countries by sea instead. In 1639 one of these convoys was attacked off the English coast by the Dutch admiral Maarten Tromp, leading to the Battle of the Downs in which Tromp annihilated the Spanish fleet that had been escorting the troop ships. This catastrophic defeat crippled Spanish naval power, making it all but impossible for Spain to get reinforcements and supplies to the Army of Flanders, and this strategic catastrophe was instrumental in finally bringing about an end to the Eighty Years' War with the Peace of Münster.

Logistics 
There was no organised system of accommodation for the troops marching along the Spanish Road. Officers would sometimes be able to stay in towns along the route, but their men had to sleep under bushes or construct makeshift huts for themselves at the end of a day's march. Local people were generally fearful of the soldiers that passed through because of the reputation that all armies of this period had for plunder and thievery even when in friendly territory. In 1580, the officers of a Spanish tercio occupied a house in Franche-Comté only to find there was no furniture inside, as the occupants of the house had removed it all to preclude the possibility of its being vandalised, burned or stolen.

Armies only marched along the Spanish Road once or twice a year at most, and because of this no conventional military magazines were established along the route. There was however a system of etapés for provisioning troops at particular points, using commissioners sent by the Governors of the Spanish Netherlands or Milan to work out pricing details. The first type of etapé was found only in Savoy, and took the form of a permanent waystation where soldiers and merchant travellers along the Road had access to food and shelter when they passed through. The second type, found in Franche-Comté, Lorraine and the Spanish Netherlands, was organised on an ad hoc basis through private contractors, who would calculate the payments and quantities of food required based on the expected size and schedule of each individual expedition.

Effects 
Although the Spanish Road initially had a purely military function, it also became an important trade route linking the Mediterranean to Northern Europe, similar to the mediaeval Via Imperii. The Road also prompted the Spanish to strengthen their diplomatic contacts in the Alpine region, leading to the establishment of permanent embassies in Savoy and the Swiss Confederacy that were supervised from Milan.

One unintended consequence of the Spanish Road was the circulation of the plague by soldiers and merchants travelling along it, notably in Valtellina in the wake of the Valtellina War.

Recorded expeditions, 1567–1600

See also
 Oñate treaty
 Treaty of Lyon (1601)
 Treaty of Monzón
 Valtellina War
 Eighty Years' War
 Thirty Years' War
Middle Francia
History of Burgundy
Kingdom of Burgundy
Burgundian Circle
Blue Banana

Notes

References
 Cecil John Cadoux, Philip of Spain and the Netherlands (United States of America: Archon Books, 1969), 64–67.
 Ciro Paoletti, A military history of Italy, (Westport CN: Greenwood Praeger, 2007)
 Geoffrey Parker, The Army of Flanders and the Spanish Road 1567–1659: The Logistics of Spanish Victory and Defeat in the Low Countries' Wars. Second Ed.(Cambridge: Cambridge University Press, 2004,  paperback).
 Herbert H. Rowen, ed. The Low Countries in Early Modern Times (New York: Harper and Row, Publishers, Inc., 1972), xviii.
 Herman Van der Wee, The Low Countries in the Early Modern World, trans. Lizabeth Fackelman (Great Britain: Ashgate Publishing Limited, 1993), 26.
 Jonathan I. Israel, The Dutch Republic and the Hispanic World, 1606–1661 (New York: Oxford University Press, 1989), 1–11.
 William Gaunt, Flemish Cities: Their History and Art (Great Britain: William Gaunt and Paul Elek Productions Limited, 1969), 103.

External links 
 Spanish Account of the Pass at Mont Cenis

Eighty Years' War (1566–1609)
History of transport in Germany
Military roads
Trade routes